Jean Adukwei Mensa is a Ghanaian lawyer and Chairperson of the Electoral Commission of Ghana. Prior to assuming the role of Chairperson of the Electoral Commission, Jean Mensa spent an 18 year career at the Institute of Economic Affairs (IEA) rising to the position of Executive Director and playing a pivotal role in strengthening Ghana’s democracy and promoting strong institutions.

Early life and education
Jean Mensa is the daughter of Jacob Blukoo-Allotey, a physician who was awarded the Order of the Volta in 2008. Mensa received her secondary education at St. Mary's Senior High School in Accra after completion of her basic education at Ridge Church School. She studied at the University of Ghana, Faculty of Law and received her degree in 1993. She was called to the Bar in 1995.

Career
Jean Adukwei Mensa was appointed as the Chairperson of the Electoral Commission of Ghana on 23 July 2018, after her predecessor was removed from office. For two decades, Mrs. Mensa has been a leader in policy research and advocacy. She has been involved in the development of policies such as the Presidential Transition Act of 2012, the Revised 1992 Constitution of Ghana (draft), the Political Parties Funding Bill, and the Revised Political Parties Bill.  Her specialization has been developing and implementing policy alternatives that reflect international best practice but are also tailored to Ghana’s needs. This is her first ever significant public sector appointment.

Jean was sworn in by the President of Ghana, Akufo-Addo. The swearing came in after a citizen of Ghana by the name, Fafali Nyonatorto sought to halt the President from going through with the process of appointing a new Electoral Commission chair. The citizen challenged the removal of the former Electoral Commission to enable the court to hear her substantive case. The President claimed the removal of the former Chairperson of the Electoral Commission Charlotte Osei from her office was carried on with no malice. The president said it was expected of him to discharge the constitutional mandate.

Mrs. Mensa’s long record of promoting national unity and cohesion include facilitating the IEA’s Evening Encounter Series, Ghana’s Presidential and Vice-Presidential Debates, as well as Town Hall Meetings for parliamentary candidates. These events not only bolstered accountability and  transparency of the political process but also allowed an interface between Candidates and their constituents.

Prior to working at the IEA, Mrs Mensa also worked at Amarkai Amarteifio Chambers (1995-1997) and BJ Da Rocha Chambers as a Junior Lawyer (1998).

Mensa has been ranked by the African Network of Entrepreneurs (TANOE) as one of the Top 60 outstanding, inspiring and hardworking corporate women leaders in Ghana (2017). She has won several awards including the Excellent Leadership Award by the EXLA Group (2013) and the Young Professional Role Model in Governance Award presented by the Young Professionals and Youth Coalition Initiative (2014).

Controversy 
The Electoral Commission chaired by Jean was cautioned by the former president of Ghana John Mahama not to compile a new voter's register. He claimed there is not much time left for the general election  to compile a new voters' register. He said Jean Mensah and her outfit will be held responsible if the country turns into a turmoil after the 2020 general elections take place. Demonstrations took place across the country in three cities Tamale, Kumasi and Accra to sound their view against the compilation.

During the collation after the 2020 election, Jean Mensa is alleged to have sent the representatives of the NDC in the National Collation Centre  to convey a message to their flagbearer but however proceeded to announce the election results after they departed with her message. The 2020 election declaration made by Jean Mensa was declared as flawed and a mathematical impossibility by several groups in Ghana with a group called the Democratic Credentials Network Ghana demanding her resignation. In the aftermath of her declaration, the Electoral Commission issued an unsigned press release clarifying the disparities in the election declaration.

During the 2021 Election Petition Hearing at the Ghana Supreme Court, Jean Mensa through her lawyer refused to mount the witness box to be cross examined by the petitioners lawyers .

References

Living people
Place of birth missing (living people)
Year of birth missing (living people)
20th-century Ghanaian lawyers
University of Ghana alumni
Ghanaian women lawyers
St Mary's Senior High School (Ghana) alumni
Ridge Church School alumni
Ghanaian people of Jamaican descent
Ghanaian people of German descent
Ghanaian people of Danish descent
Ghanaian people of English descent